The Borough of Scarborough is a non-metropolitan district and borough of North Yorkshire, England.  In addition to the town of Scarborough, it covers a large stretch of the coast of Yorkshire, including Whitby and Filey. It borders Redcar and Cleveland to the north, the Ryedale and Hambleton districts to the west and the East Riding of Yorkshire to the south.

The district was formed on 1 April 1974, under the Local Government Act 1972.  It was a merger of the urban district of Filey and part of the Bridlington Rural District, from the historic East Riding of Yorkshire, along with the municipal borough of Scarborough, Scalby and Whitby urban districts, and Scarborough Rural District and Whitby Rural District, from the historic North Riding.

In 2007, the borough was threatened with extinction.  In March of that year, North Yorkshire County Council was shortlisted by the Department for Communities and Local Government to become a unitary authority.  If the bid had been successful then the Borough of Scarborough would — along with all other districts and boroughs in the present county of North Yorkshire — have been abolished then. The bid, however, was unsuccessful and the districts remained as they were previously constituted.

However, in July 2021 the Ministry of Housing, Communities and Local Government announced that in April 2023, the non-metropolitan county will be reorganised into a unitary authority.  Scarborough Borough Council will be abolished and its functions transferred to a new single authority for the non-metropolitan county of North Yorkshire.

Education
There are a total of 64 schools and colleges in the Scarborough area, as of 2012.

Localities
The Borough of Scarborough includes many civil parishes & suburbs including: Brompton-by-Sawdon, Broxa-cum-Troutsdale, Cloughton, Commondale, Crossgates, Eastfield, Glaisdale, Houlsyke, Hunmanby, Hutton Buscel, Irton, Littlebeck, Muston, Newby and Scalby, Ravenscar, Ruston, Silpho, Snainton, Seamer, West Ayton, Wykeham and others.

Wards of the Scarborough town are Castle, Central, Eastfield, Falsgrave Park, Newby, North Bay, Northstead, Ramshill, Stepney, Weaponness, and Woodlands. Areas without namesake wards include Westborough (centre), Barrowcliff and Newlands.

In 2016, the borough ranked second in Visit England's survey overall holiday trips and holiday spend, missing out on the top spot only to London.

Media 
Since 1882, it has been served by The Scarborough News, which is published every Thursday. 

The Scarborough Borough receives a daily radio news services from these radio stations, BBC Radio York that covers Scarborough, BBC Radio Tees covering Whitby & Greatest Hits Radio Yorkshire Coast which It was previously known as Yorkshire Coast Radio and had studios in Scarborough and transmitters in Scarborough and Whitby. 

Local news and television programmes in Scarborough is covered by BBC Yorkshire & ITV Yorkshire from Leeds and Whitby receives their local news and television programmes from BBC North East & Cumbria & ITV Tyne Tees in Newcastle.

Freedom of the Borough
The following people and military units have received the Freedom of the Borough of Scarborough.

Individuals
 H.D.G. Leveson-Gower: 1950
 Max Jaffa: 1986.
 Alan Ayckbourn: 1986.
 Alan Booth: 1999
 Charles McCarthy: 1996.
 Max Payne : 1999.
 Thomas Pindar: 1999.
 Sir John Wilson: 1999.
 Bernard Bosomworth: 2005.
 Elizabeth Mackenzie: 2005.
 Jimmy Savile: 2005. (Revoked on 5 November 2012 by unanimous vote of Scarborough Borough Council due to the sexual abuse scandal).
 Christopher Wilby: 2005.
 Ken Dale: 2009.
 Baron Derwent: 2009.
 Tony Peers: 2009.
 George Thomas Tuby: 2009.
 Paul Ingle: 24 February 2012.
 Andrew Boyes: 24 February 2012.
 Timothy Boyes: 24 February 2012.
 Donald Robinson: 24 February 2012.

Military Units
 64 Medical Squadron 5 Medical Regiment RAMC: 2007.
 3 Medical Regiment RAMC: May 2015.
 The Yorkshire Regiment.

Borough council
The political composition of the council at all-up elections, ignoring intervening by-elections, since the 2003 election is as follows:

See also
Scarborough local elections

References 

 
Non-metropolitan districts of North Yorkshire
Boroughs in England